The 1950–51 Polska Liga Hokejowa season was the 16th season of the Polska Liga Hokejowa, the top level of ice hockey in Poland. Four teams participated in the final round, and Legia Warszawa won the championship.

Qualification
 Górnik Janów - Kolejarz Torun 7:2/6:5

Final Tournament

External links
 Season on hockeyarchives.info

Polska
Polska Hokej Liga seasons
1950–51 in Polish ice hockey